This is a list of public art in Jersey City, New Jersey, in the United States. This list applies only to works of public art on permanent display in an outdoor public space and does not include artworks in museums. Public art may include sculptures, statues, monuments, memorials, murals, and mosaics.

See also
Lincoln Park (Jersey City)
Pershing Field
List of public art in Newark, New Jersey

References

External links
Exchange Place Alliance

Jersey City, New Jersey
 
Public art